The 1979 Australian Formula 2 Championship was a CAMS sanctioned Australian motor racing title open to racing cars complying with Australian Formula 2. It was the 12th Australian Formula 2 Championship. The title was won by Brian Shead driving a Cheetah Mk. 6 Toyota.

Calendar
The championship was contested over a three-round series.

Points system
Championship points were awarded on a 9-6-4-3-2-1 basis to the top six placegetters at each round.

For the round which was contested over two heats, round placings were determined by allocating points on a 20-16-13-11-10-9-8-7-6-5-4-3-2-1 basis to the top 14 finishers in each race. Championship points were then awarded based on the round results.

Championship results

References

Further reading
 Jim Shepherd, A History of Australian Motor Sport, 1980, pages 85 to 86

External links
 Symmons Plains Raceway - 11 November 1979 - Images and Race Program Entry List, oldmotorsportphotos.com.au, as archived at web.archive.org

Australian Formula 2 Championship
Formula 2 Championship